Michelle Claire Edwards (born 11 July 1974) is a South African badminton player.

Career 
Edwards played badminton at the 2004 Summer Olympics, losing to Aparna Popat of India in the round of 32 in the women's singles. In the women's doubles, Edwards and her partner Chantal Botts were defeated by Nicole Grether and Juliane Schenk of Germany in the round of 32.

In 2007, she won 3 medals in badminton at the 2007 All-Africa Games, a gold medal in women's doubles with Chantal Botts, a silver medal in women's singles, and a bronze medal in mixed doubles.

She also participated in the Summer Olympic Games of 2008 and 2012 in the women's doubles event. At the 2008 Summer Olympics she competed with Chantal Botts, they lost to Taipei in the first round. In the 2012 Summer Olympics, her partner was Annari Viljoen. Together, they reached the quarter finals, where they lost to the Russian pair of Valeria Sorokina and Nina Vislova.

Achievements

All African  Games 
Women's singles

Women's doubles

Mixed doubles

African Championships 
Women's singles

Women's doubles

Mixed doubles

BWF International Challenge/Series 
Women's singles

Women's doubles

Mixed doubles

  BWF International Challenge tournament
  BWF International Series tournament
  BWF Future Series tournament

References

External links 
 
 
 
 
 

1974 births
Living people
Sportspeople from Durban
South African people of British descent
South African female badminton players
Badminton players at the 2004 Summer Olympics
Badminton players at the 2008 Summer Olympics
Badminton players at the 2012 Summer Olympics
Olympic badminton players of South Africa
Badminton players at the 1998 Commonwealth Games
Badminton players at the 2006 Commonwealth Games
Commonwealth Games competitors for South Africa
Competitors at the 2003 All-Africa Games
Competitors at the 2007 All-Africa Games
African Games gold medalists for South Africa
African Games silver medalists for South Africa
African Games bronze medalists for South Africa
African Games medalists in badminton
20th-century South African women
21st-century South African women